NSLA may refer to:

 National and State Libraries Australia
 National Summer Learning Association